Valentina Pinelo was a Spanish poet and writer at the beginning of the 17th century, during the Spanish Golden Age of politics and culture.

Born into a wealthy Genovese family, at age 4 years she was sent to a convent at San Leandro in Seville to become a nun. She was in contact with  certain intellectuals of the era, including the celebrated playwright Lope de Vega, who dedicated several laudatory poems to her.

She wrote Libro de las alabanzas y excelencias de la gloriosa Santa Ana published by Clemente Hidalgo in 1601. This work is studied by researchers of Mariology.

A street in Seville is named in Valentina Pinelo's honour.

See also

Spanish Baroque literature

References 

 LUNA, L.: Leyendo como una mujer, Barcelona, Anthropos, 1996.

17th-century Spanish poets
Spanish Golden Age
Spanish women poets
Baroque writers